Tanglefoot Seaplane Base  is a privately owned, public-use seaplane base in Bonner County, Idaho, United States. It is located at Priest Lake, on west shore of Cavanaugh Bay.

Facilities and aircraft 
It has one landing area (15/33) measuring 10,000 x 2,000 feet (3,048 x 610 m). For the 12-month period ending May 21, 2007, the airport had 175 general aviation aircraft operations.

See also 
 Cavanaugh Bay Airport
 Priest Lake USFS Airport

References

External links 
Tanglefoot Seaplane Base (D28) at Idaho Transportation Department

Airports in Idaho
Seaplane bases in the United States
Buildings and structures in Bonner County, Idaho
Transportation in Bonner County, Idaho